Jean Louis Lemieux (born May 31, 1952) is a Canadian former professional ice hockey defenceman.

Selected by the Atlanta Flames in the 1972 NHL Draft, Lemieux played parts of two and a half seasons with the Flames before he was traded to the Washington Capitals in the deal that sent Bill Clement to Atlanta. Lemieux played for the Capitals through the 1977–78 season.

Career statistics

Regular season and playoffs

External links

Profile at hocketdraftcentral.com

1952 births
Living people
Atlanta Flames draft picks
Atlanta Flames players
Canadian ice hockey defencemen
Hershey Bears players
Ice hockey people from Quebec
Nova Scotia Voyageurs players
Omaha Knights (CHL) players
Sherbrooke Castors players
Sportspeople from Rouyn-Noranda
Springfield Indians players
Washington Capitals players